= Meva =

MEVA International
- Company type: Private
- Industry: Technology
- Founded: 2008
- Headquarters: Dubai, UAE
- Products: Broad range
- Website: www.mymeva.com

MEVA International is a private brand that supplies PC accessories to the international market.

== Regional markets ==
The company launched its products in 2008 in Iran, but it also has sales throughout the broader middle eastern region.
